Francis Hawley may refer to:
 Francis Hawley, 1st Baron Hawley, English politician, soldier and peer
 Francis Hawley, 2nd Baron Hawley, British landowner and politician